The 1883 FA Cup final was contested by Blackburn Olympic and Old Etonians at the Kennington Oval. Blackburn Olympic won 2–1 after extra time. James Costley and Arthur Matthews scored for Blackburn; Harry Goodhart for Old Etonians. It was a watershed match for the sport, as for the first time in an FA Cup final a working-class team playing the 'combination game' (passing) were triumphant over a team playing the public school tactics of 'rushing' and 'scrimmages'.

Overview
Blackburn Olympic, coached by former England player, Jack Hunter, had previously eliminated Lower Darwen, Darwen Ramblers and Druids, reaching the final after a 4–0 over Old Carthusians in the semi-final. On the other hand, Old Etonians earned to play their third consecutive final, although they were not the favourites to win the match.

The following is the chronicle of the match, as it appeared on The Morning Post:

Match details

References

The Early Years of the FA Cup: How the British Army Helped Establish the World's First Football Tournament: p. 164 Author: James W Bancroft

1883
1882–83 in English football
1883 sports events in London
March 1883 sports events